Lundar Airport  is located  northwest of Lundar, Manitoba, Canada.

References

Registered aerodromes in Manitoba